The Division Series is the quarterfinal round of the Major League Baseball postseason. Four series are played in this round, two each for both the American League and the National League.

1981 season
The first use of the term "Division Series" dates from 1981, when due to a mid-season players' strike, that season was divided into two halves, with the winners of each half from each division playing one another in a best-of-five series to decide which team would represent that division in the League Championship Series (this format being common in minor-league baseball). But because the two halves of the season were independent of one another, the winner of the first half had no real incentive to try to win the second half as well (since, unlike in the minor leagues, if the same team did win both halves it was not given a bye into the next round), and a team that won neither half could have actually had the best overall record in the division; indeed, the latter actually occurred, as the Cincinnati Reds and the St. Louis Cardinals had the two best won-lost records (in both halves of the season combined) in the National League West and East respectively, with the Reds having the best overall winning percentage in all of Major League Baseball, yet neither advanced to the playoffs because they finished second in their divisions in each half. Until the 2012 format revision, this was the only Division Series which actually consisted of teams from the same division playing each other. This particular Division Series was meant as a one-off series due to the strike.

1993–1994: Proposal, realignment, and cancellation of 1994 postseason
In 1993, the owners approved the reintroduction of the Division Series, this time on a permanent basis, given the fact that three of the four series in the one-off 1981 Division Series went to a game 5.  Originally the format called for the top team in the AL East to play the 2nd place team in the AL West and vice versa. In 1994, both the National League and the American League realigned, with the number of divisions in both increasing from two to three (adding a Central Division, with fewer teams in each division).  At the same time, the number of teams qualifying for baseball's postseason was doubled, from four to eight; henceforth the three first-place teams from each league's divisions would reach the postseason, along with one wild card team from each league (the latter being the second-place finisher with the best regular-season record).  However, this expanded playoff format did not return until the following year, because a players' strike, which began on August 12, 1994, led to the cancellation of that season's playoffs and World Series (and caused the 1995 regular season to have 18 fewer games for each team than the standard 162 [for a total of 144 games]).

1995–1997: Pre-arranged seeding
Since its inception, the Division Series has been best-of-five; however, both the method of awarding home-field advantage in the series and which games the team getting the advantage would host were changed in 1998.

Originally, the East, Central, and West Division champions rotated home-site priority, with two division winners getting the extra home game, and third one not having the extra game along with the wild-card team, who never have it. The 2–3 format was used in which the disadvantaged team hosted the first two games, and the team with the advantage hosted the remaining game(s). This made it impossible for the disadvantaged team to clinch the series at home. A similar format had been used for the League Championship Series from 1969 to 1984. It also allowed the disadvantaged teams the unusual luxury of starting a series at home, and a guarantee that they play two games at home.

1998–2011
The two division champions with the best regular-season records have been accorded with the home-field advantage, forcing the worst division winner to play an extra road game. Also, the format changed to a 2–2–1 layout with the team having home-field advantage hosting Games 1, 2, and (if necessary) 5. In both the AL and the NL, the three division champions were automatically given the top three seeds, seeded #1-3 based on record, and the wild-card was given the 4th seed regardless of record. In both the AL and the NL, the #1 seed played the #4 seed and the #2 seed played the #3 seed, unless the #1 and #4 seed were in the same division. Because teams from the same division couldn't play each other in the first round, if the normal matchups would cause this, then the #1 seed played the #3 seed, and the #2 seed played the #4 seed. In all cases, the top two seeds had home-field advantage.

From 2007–2011, the #1 seed of the league that won the All-Star Game was given another advantage. In addition to earning home-field advantage throughout the entire playoffs, they were allowed to choose their schedule for the series. They could either choose to have an extra day off (usually between games 1 and 2) during the series and start a day early, or start a day late, with one less off day (only having travel days off, between games 2 and 3, and if necessary 4 and 5). The American League's best record received this option from 2007–2009 and the National League's best record received it in 2010.

2012–2019, 2021
A revised playoff system was utilized beginning with the 2012 season, which added a second wild-card team for each league. The two wild card teams in each league played a one game playoff to advance. The winner of this game advanced to play the #1 seed in the league in the Division Series, regardless of whether the two teams were in the same division. Because the format was added well after the regular season schedule was announced, the 2012 Division Series used a 2–3 format. From 2013 to 2021, the Division Series used the 2–2–1 format previously used.

The 2020 edition of the Division Series was modified from usual formatting due to the expanding of the playoffs for the 60-game regular season that saw the LDS be the second round of the postseason after a Wild Card Series that saw all three divisions get at least two playoff teams. The winners of the 1/8 matchup faced the winners of the 4/5 matchup while the 2/7 faced the 3/6. When every team from the Central division lost, it meant that the LDS matchups would all feature teams from the same division playing each other (i.e. East playing East and West playing West), the first occasion of this happening since 1981. Each of the four LDS matchups were played in consecutive days in neutral sites that had a 2-2-1 structure in who batted first between the team with the best record.

Since 2022
Since the  season, the top two seeds get byes to the Division Series. The #1 seed faces the 4/5 winner, and the #2 seed plays the 3/6 winner. The Wild Card round was expanded to a best-of-three series, and the winners of that round would advance to the Division Series. As always, the brackets are fixed, without re-seeding.

Criticism of scheduling
There has been some criticism on how Major League Baseball schedules Division Series games. Teams with large national fan followings like the New York Yankees are almost always scheduled to play in prime time at 8 p.m. ET/5 p.m. PT to generate the highest TV ratings. As a result, West Coast teams generally have to play on the road in the afternoon, when many of their fans are unable to watch the game because they are at work or school. Conversely, when games on the West Coast are played at 10 p.m. ET/7 p.m. PT, many fans on the East Coast are unable to watch a game in its entirety, due to work or school the next day and games ending around 1 a.m. ET/10 p.m. PT, while most West Coast fans are able to watch the entire game as it will not end as late on the West Coast.

However, during the inaugural and 1995 seasons, the Division and League Championship Series was aired by the league's television operation, The Baseball Network, a joint syndication package between ABC and NBC. In order to increase viewership, all games were played in primetime at consistent times, and each affiliate of the network carrying the series could only air one of the games each night, determined by the station's area. While this prevented the issue of afternoon games (and did, as planned, increase viewership), the plan drew ire from critics for not allowing viewers to choose the games they want to watch during the post-season.

See also

MLB division winners
American League Division Series
National League Division Series
MLB postseason
Wild Card Series
League Championship Series

References

External links
Top 7 :: Division Series Moments

Major League Baseball postseason
Recurring events established in 1995
October sporting events
Annual events in Major League Baseball